In physics, the supersymmetric WKB (SWKB) approximation is an extension of the WKB approximation that uses principles from supersymmetric quantum mechanics to provide estimations on energy eigenvalues in quantum-mechanical systems. Using the supersymmetric method, there are potentials  that can be expressed in terms of a superpotential, such that

The addition of the supersymmetric method provides several appealing qualities to this method. First, it is known that, by construction, the ground state energy will be exactly estimated. This is an improvement over the standard WKB approximation, which often has weaknesses at lower energies. Another property is that a class of potentials known as shape invariant potentials have their energy spectra estimated exactly by this first-order condition.

See also
Quantum mechanics
Supersymmetric quantum mechanics
Supersymmetry
WKB approximation

References

Supersymmetry
Quantum mechanics
Theoretical physics
Mathematical physics
Approximations